Sinatra and Friends is an American television special that aired on April 21, 1977, on ABC. Featuring contemporary artists such as John Denver and Natalie Cole, as well as Dean Martin, Tony Bennett, Loretta Lynn, Leslie Uggams and Robert Merrill, Sinatra performs duets of standards in different styles such as folk and disco in addition to each singer performing solo.

Sinatra and Friends was released on DVD in 2002.

Track listing
 "Where or When" (Sinatra and Company)
 "I've Got You Under My Skin" (Sinatra)
 "I Get a Kick Out of You" (Sinatra and Cole)
 "I've Got Love on My Mind" (Cole)
 "If I Were a Rich Man" (Merrill)
 "The Oldest Established (Permanent Floating Crap Game in New York)" (Sinatra, Martin, Merrill)
 "She's Got You" (Lynn)
 "All or Nothing at All" (Sinatra and Lynn)
 "One" (Bennett)
 "My Kind of Town" (Sinatra and Bennett)
 "I Honestly Love You" (Uggams)
 "The Lady Is a Tramp" (Sinatra and Uggams)
 "My Sweet Lady" (Denver)
 "September Song" (Sinatra and Denver)
 "Night and Day" (Sinatra)
 "Everybody 'Ought to Be in Love"
 "Put Your Dreams Away (For Another Day)"

1977 television specials
1970s American television specials
American television specials
Frank Sinatra television specials